The World Adventure Golf Masters (WAGM) is an annual miniature golf competition held by the World Minigolf Sport Federation (WMSF). Founded in Hastings, England, in 2011 with 30 competitors from 6 countries. In 2019, it was hosted in Kungälv, Sweden, with 93 competitors from 14 countries including Sweden, Germany, New Zealand, and the United States.

Rules
The WAGM is played on an adventure-style miniature golf course with miniature golf balls. Categories include a women's and men's category, as well as senior men and senior women (46 years and older), male and female youth (up to 18 years), and an overall category. In addition, there's a team competition where countries compete in teams of four.

History

For its first three years (2011–2013), the WAGM was played in Hastings, England. Participants were mostly from the UK and Germany, with a small number of participants from other countries in Europe, like Sweden and Finland.

In 2014, the competition was held in Gullbergsbro, Gothenburg, Sweden and 50 competitors participated.

In 2016, the competition was held in Pristina, Kosovo. The number of competing countries rose to 15, from 8 the year before.

WAGM Results 2011 to 2022

References 

Miniature golf